Little Shelford is a village located to the south of Cambridge, in the county of Cambridgeshire, in eastern England.  The River Granta lies between it and the larger village of Great Shelford, and both are served by Shelford railway station, which is on the West Anglia Main Line from Cambridge to London Liverpool Street. The village has one pub, The Navigator, on the High Street.

The parish is mostly low-lying. It is bounded on the west by the M11 motorway and by field boundaries, and on the east by the River Cam or Granta. The highest point of the parish is Clunch Pit Hill, 31 m (TL447499).

Church and notable families
The Church of All Saints, Little Shelford is the village's Church of England parish church. The church is a Grade II* listed building, and dates from the 12th century.

Three tablets commemorate General Sir Charles Wale, who survived many battles to die at Little Shelford in 1848; his son, who fell at the Siege of Lucknow; and his eight grandsons and great-grandsons who died in World War I. Other notable members of the Wale family associated with Little Shelford include Thomas Wale, Gregory Wale and Henry Charles Wale. A monument to Gregory Wale can be seen on St Margaret's Mount to the west of the village.

Locality
The de Freville manor house survives. One of many hidden ways leads past the manor and the farm where the river slips through a wood and kingfishers streak over an ancient mill pool.

The children's writer Philippa Pearce renamed the village "Little Barley", with Great Shelford becoming "Great Barley", the River Cam, which flows through the area, becoming the "River Say", and Cambridge being renamed "Castleford" and deprived of its university.  These names are used in a number of her books, most famously Minnow on the Say (1955) and Tom's Midnight Garden (1958).

References

 Mee, Arthur, (revised by CLS Linnell & ET Long), The King's England - Cambridgeshire, Hodder and Stoughton, London, New revised edition, 1965, P.165-6.

External links

Little Shelford website
2001 Census
All Saints church
Little Shelford history website

Villages in Cambridgeshire
Civil parishes in Cambridgeshire
South Cambridgeshire District